Godspelized is an album by the American jazz saxophonist David S. Ware, recorded in 1996 and released on the Japanese DIW label. It was the first recording by the David S. Ware Quartet with drummer Susie Ibarra replacing Whit Dickey. The album includes a version of Sun Ra composition "The Stargazers".

Reception

In his review for AllMusic, Thom Jurek states: "This is purely spiritual music, inspiring, moving, and deeply affecting."
The Penguin Guide to Jazz awarded the album one of its rare crown accolades, writing that "only Charles Gayle, another William Parker associate, has managed to push the Coltrane idiom further out."

The Wire placed the album in their "50 Records Of The Year 1996" list.

Track listing
All compositions by David S. Ware except as indicated
 "Godspelized" – 15:44
 "Wisdomsphere" – 7:55 
 "Inner Temple" – 6:40 
 "Wisdom Through Time" – 7:54 
 "The Stargazers" (Sun Ra) – 12:26
 "Eternal Faces of Brahm" – 11:44
 "Godspelized" – 4:20

Personnel
David S. Ware – tenor sax
Matthew Shipp – piano
William Parker – bass
Susie Ibarra – drums

References

1996 albums
David S. Ware albums
DIW Records albums